Jean Howard (born Ernestine Hill; October 13, 1910 – March 20, 2000) was an American actress and professional photographer. She was born in Longview, Texas and died in Beverly Hills, California.

Early years
Howard was born Ernestine Hill on October 13, 1919, in Longview, Texas. She grew up in Dallas, and her father traveled as a salesman. When she was a teenager, she accompanied her nephew to a photographic studio to have his portrait taken. Paul Mahoney, the photographer, took her photograph, which led to his becoming her teacher and mentor. "Young, eager, and frustrated," Howard changed her name to Ernestine Mahoney and began participating in beauty contests and fashion shows. Her father paid her expenses while Mahoney taught her.

Howard acted in local theatrical productions before she went to Hollywood in the late 1920s and became a part of the Studio Club, a group for women who hoped to act in films.

Career
Howard's time as a Goldwyn Girl began when she responded to an advertisement. Her film debut came in Whoopee (1930). Florenz Ziegfeld Jr. selected Howard as one of four women from that film to appear in his upcoming musical production, Smiles, but she had to go to Dallas after her father died in an automobile accident. Ziegfeld gave her a role in the 1931 edition of the Ziegfeld Follies, billing her as Jean Howard. She next appeared in Ziegfeld's Hot-Cha (1932).

A contract with MGM resulted in Howard's appearing in The Prizefighter and the Lady (1933) and Broadway to Hollywood (1933). She also appeared in Claudia (1943), Break of Hearts, Dancing Lady, and The Final Hour.

Howard studied photography at the Los Angeles Art Center. She appeared on Broadway in the productions: The Age of Innocence with Franchot Tone and Evensong.

She often used her camera to capture moments from Hollywood during the 1940s and 1950s. She photographed parties, gatherings, sports tournaments, etc., shooting Tyrone Power, Gene Tierney, Richard Burton, Cole Porter, Judy Garland, Grace Kelly, Hedy Lamarr, Jennifer Jones, Deborah Kerr, Geraldine Page, Ethel Barrymore, Laurence Olivier and Vivien Leigh. Two books of her photographs were published, Jean Howard's Hollywood: A Photo Memoir (1989) and Travels With Cold Porter (1991).

Personal life and death
Howard married Hollywood talent agent Charles K. Feldman on August 25, 1934, in Harrison, New York, and they divorced in 1948, the couple continued to live together until his death in 1968. The union was childless. She married Tony Santoro, a musician from Italy, in 1973.

Howard died on March 20, 2000, in her Beverly Hills, California, home. She was buried in Hollywood Forever Cemetery.

References

Sources
The Stars of Hollywood Forever: 1901-2006 (//ASIN: B0006SA7KO); Publisher: Tony Scott Publishing; 1st edition (2001)

External links
  
 
 

1910 births
2000 deaths
20th-century American actresses
Actresses from Texas
American film actresses
American stage actresses
American female dancers
Dancers from Texas
20th-century American photographers
Burials at Hollywood Forever Cemetery
People from Longview, Texas
Ziegfeld girls
20th-century American dancers
20th-century American women photographers